The Trümmelbach Falls in Switzerland are a series of ten glacier-fed waterfalls inside the mountain made accessible by a tunnel-funicular, built 1913, stairs, and illumination.

Located in the Lauterbrunnen Valley, the creek called Trimmelbach or Trümmelbach alone drains the northerly glacier defiles of Eiger (3967 m), Mönch (4099 m), and Jungfrau (4158 m) and carries more than 20,000 tons of boulder detritus per year.

The falls carry up to 20,000 litres of water per second.

After the hamlet of the same name on the valley floor the Trümmelbach feed into the Weisse Lütschine, which heads north through the valley and the village of Lauterbrunnen further down to join after  its sister river, the Schwarze Lütschine at Zweilütschinen, where they join to the Lütschine.

References

External links

 

Waterfalls of Switzerland
Tourist attractions in Switzerland
wTrummelbach